Gazeta is a hamlet and council located in the municipality of Elburgo/Burgelu, in Álava province, Basque Country, Spain. As of 2020, it has a population of 51.

Geography 
Gazeta is located 22km east of Vitoria-Gasteiz.

References

Populated places in Álava